The cryptic honeyeater (Microptilotis imitatrix), also known as the imitatress honeyeater, is a species of bird in the family Meliphagidae. It is found in northeastern Queensland in Australia. Its natural habitats are subtropical or tropical moist lowland forest and subtropical or tropical mangrove forest.

References

cryptic honeyeater
Birds of Queensland
Endemic birds of Australia
cryptic honeyeater